Talapoptera is a monotypic moth genus of the family Erebidae erected by George Hampson in 1926.

The only species in this genus, Talapoptera duplexa, first described by Frederic Moore in 1882, is known from India.

References

Calpinae
Moths of Asia
Monotypic moth genera
Noctuoidea genera